MyFerryLink was  an English Channel passenger and freight ferry company which began operating between Dover and Calais in August 2012. It was formed following the liquidation of SeaFrance. MyFerryLink offered passengers up to sixteen sailings between Dover and Calais every day, and additional services for freight.

The ships were leased to a workers' co-operative, Scop SeaFrance, that operated the company's sailings between Britain and France and employed all the on-board staff. It was a société coopérative et participative,  or

History
On 6 June 2013, the UK Competition Commission ruled that Eurotunnel, which leased the three MyFerryLink vessels to the SCOP, could no longer operate ferry services from Dover, due to the proportion of the cross-Channel market that they held as a result. The ruling was appealed by Eurotunnel, allowing sailings operated by the company to continue as normal.

On 20 May 2014, the Competition & Markets Authority (CMA) that had succeeded the Competition Commission, ruled that the SCOP could no longer operate ferry services from Dover. Scop SeaFrance pointed out a potential conflict of interest: an ex accountant of DFDS was now a member of UK Competition Commission, and appealed.

On 15 May 2015 the Court of Appeal overturned the CMA ruling, on the grounds of "fair competition", but the CMA then lodged an appeal to the UK Supreme Court.

On 8 June 2015, Eurotunnel tired of the continuous fight, their lease of the ships to Scop SeaFrance was due to end on 1 July 2015, and they announced they would not extend it, and instead had entered a lease-buy deal for DFDS to acquire the ships Rodin and Berlioz. Eurotunnel will keep operating Nord Pas-de-Calais for dangerous goods.

MyFerryLink workers went on strike on 1 July 2015 in protest against expected job losses. MyFerryLink services ceased at midnight on 1/2 July. On 15 July MyFerryLink workers occupied both MS Rodin and MS Berlioz in the Port of Calais  and began sabotaging the ships in protest of their impending lease-buy to DFDS. DFDS ships were also refused entry by dockers to the Port of Calais and were only able to operate their Dover/Dunkerque route, causing major congestion on both sides of the channel, with Operation Stack still in place on the UK side. DFDS staff reported that the MyFerryLink workers had reportedly destroyed safety and alarm systems on the ships and activated flotation and life-saving equipment, so as to make the ships unusable.

Facilities on board passenger services
Passengers travelling on the Berlioz and the Rodin had access to a range of onboard facilities during the 90-minute crossing between Dover and Calais. These included:

Le Relais: A self-service restaurant serving a range of meals, including dishes for children, prepared by onboard chefs.
Le Pub: A bar where drinks and snacks could be purchased during the crossing.
La Boutique: An onboard shop selling alcohol, tobacco, perfumes and other gifts.
Playzone: A play area with toys and games for children.

Former fleet

References

External links

Ferry companies of France
Transport companies established in 2012
Transport companies disestablished in 2015
2012 establishments in France
2015 disestablishments in France